Eremophila rigens is a flowering plant in the figwort family, Scrophulariaceae and is endemic to Western Australia. It is an erect shrub with long, stiff, glabrous leaves and pale lilac-coloured to white flowers.

Description
The branches and leaves are covered with a dense layer of fine white hairs when young but soon become glabrous. The leaves are arranged alternately and are densely clustered near the ends of the branches, linear in shape and tapering towards both ends.

The sepals have a sharply pointed end and are very rigid when dry. The petal tube is pale lilac-coloured to white and hairy on the outside. The inside surface of the petal lobes is mostly glabrous but the inside of the petal tube is filled with long, soft hairs. The 4 stamens are fully enclosed in the petal tube.

Taxonomy and naming 
Eremophila rigens was first formally described by Robert Chinnock in 2007 and the description was published in Eremophila and Allied Genera: A Monograph of the Plant Family Myoporaceae. The specific epithet (rigens) is derived from the Latin word rigeo meaning "to be stiff or rigid", referring to the sepals of this species.

Distribution and habitat
This eremophila grows in stony hills and clay flats along drainage lines between Mount Augustus and Ashburton Downs in the Gascoyne biogeographic region.

Conservation
Eremophila rigens is classified as "Priority Three" by the Western Australian Government Department of Parks and Wildlife, meaning that it is poorly known and known from only a few locations but is not under imminent threat.

References

Eudicots of Western Australia
rigens
Endemic flora of Western Australia
Plants described in 2007
Taxa named by Robert Chinnock